The Green Goddess is a 1923 American silent adventure film based on the play The Green Goddess by William Archer. Set during the British Raj, it stars George Arliss as the Rajah of Rukh, into whose land arrive three British subjects, played by Alice Joyce, David Powell, and Harry T. Morey. Arliss, Joyce and Ivan F. Simpson reprised their roles from the play and also in the 1930 talking film version The Green Goddess.

Cast
George Arliss as Rajah of Rukh
Alice Joyce as Lucilla Crespin
David Powell as Dr. Traherne
Harry T. Morey as Major Crespin
Jetta Goudal as Ayah
Ivan F. Simpson as Watkins (credited as Ivan Simpson)
William Worthington as The High Priest

Preservation
A copy of The Green Goddess is in the UCLA Film and Television Archive.

References

External links

Selection of posters for The Green Goddess
Stills at the stanford.edu Alice Joyce website
 The Green Goddess website dedicated to Sidney Olcott

1923 films
American adventure drama films
American silent feature films
American black-and-white films
American films based on plays
Films directed by Sidney Olcott
Films set in the British Raj
Films set in India
Films set in the Himalayas
Indian mythology in popular culture
Hindu mythology in popular culture
Goldwyn Pictures films
1920s adventure drama films
1923 drama films
1920s American films
Silent American drama films
Silent adventure films